The Cooks was an Australian television drama series that ran for one season on Network Ten during the summer of 2004/05. It was a co-production with subscription television and screened on the UKTV channel on Foxtel. It was produced by Penny Chapman and Sue Masters. The directors were Tony Tilse, Ian Gilmour, Brendan Maher and Ian Watson.

The Cooks was about the love and war involving the staff of two restaurants on the same street. R&R's Restaurant was run by chefs Rita and Ruth, with waitress Argentine Carmelita. Across the road at Snatch and Grab, its chefs are Gabe and Sachin, who's of Indian descent, with Dishpig at the sink.

The Cooks was a spin-off of a telemovie called Temptation, which screened in 2003, starring Colin Friels as Roberto Francobelli.

Locations
Most of the exterior scenes were filmed around the inner west areas of Sydney. On the show, the setting of the restaurants was in the suburb of Summer Hill.

Cast
 Toby Schmitz as Gabe Francobelli
 Kate Atkinson as Ruth O'Neill
 Nicholas Brown as Sachin
 Rhondda Findleton as Rita Molloy
 Leon Ford as Dishpig
 Emma Lung as Carmelita
 Bojana Novakovic as Raffa
 Sophia Irvine as Rosie Francobelli
 Matt Passmore as Jake
 Robert Mammone as Michael
 Jeanie Drynan as Leanne Smith

Episode list
 Episode 1: "Nights of Living Dangerously": Air Date: 18 October 2004
 Episode 2: "Desiree": Air Date: 28 October 2004
 Episode 3: "The Olive Garden": Air Date: 4 November 2004
 Episode 4: "Swimming Upstream": Air Date: 11 November 2004
 Episode 5: "Waltzing Sakamoto": Air Date: 18 November 2004
 Episode 6: "The Gingerbread Man": Air Date: 25 November 2004
 Episode 7: "Beef with You": Air Date: 2 December 2004
 Episode 8: "Beer and Skittles": Air Date: 9 December 2004
 Episode 9: "Blood and Chocolate": Air Date: 16 December 2004
 Episode 10: "Hole Lotta Love": Air Date: 23 December 2004
 Episode 11: "Heart of Marshmallow": Air Date: 30 December 2004
 Episode 12: "Honey and Wounds": Air Date: 6 January 2005
 Episode 13: "Sticky": Air Date: 13 January 2005
 Episode 13: "Sticky Part 2": Air Date: 14 January 2005

See also
 List of Australian television series

External links
 
 Australian Television Information Archive

Network 10 original programming
Australian drama television series
2004 Australian television series debuts
2005 Australian television series endings